Albert Omarovich Khinchagov (born 18 October 1996) is a Russian para-athlete, who won the gold medal in the shot put F37 event at the 2020 Summer Paralympics.

References

1996 births
Living people
Russian male shot putters
Paralympic athletes of Russia
Paralympic gold medalists for Russia
Athletes (track and field) at the 2020 Summer Paralympics
Medalists at the 2020 Summer Paralympics
Paralympic medalists in athletics (track and field)
Sportspeople from Vladikavkaz
Paralympic gold medalists for the Russian Paralympic Committee athletes
21st-century Russian people
North Ossetian State University alumni